AEK Karava FC was a Cypriot association football club founded in Karavas in 1957. They have 2 season in the Cypriot Third Division. After the Turkish invasion of Cyprus in July 1974, AEK Karava merged with PAEK to form PAEEK. AEK Karava FC was part of AEK Karava sports club.

References

Sources

Football clubs in Cyprus
Association football clubs established in 1957
1957 establishments in Cyprus